Gomm Valley is a  biological Site of Special Scientific Interest in Micklefield, a district of High Wycombe in Buckinghamshire. It is managed by the Berkshire, Buckinghamshire and Oxfordshire Wildlife Trust and is part of the Chilterns Area of Outstanding Natural Beauty. The local planning authority is Wycombe District Council.

The site is chalk grassland which is reverting to scrub. It has a rich variety of herbs and of invertebrates, and is notable for reptiles and over-wintering birds, particularly thrushes. Over 30 species of butterflies and 180 of moths have been recorded.

There is access by a footpath from Gomm Road.

See also
List of Sites of Special Scientific Interest in Buckinghamshire

References

Sites of Special Scientific Interest in Buckinghamshire